The Sunraysia Solar Farm is a solar farm under construction south of Balranald in south western New South Wales, Australia. It is expected to be completed around the end of 2019.

The Sunraysia Solar Farm is owned by Maoneng Australia and is being designed and built by Decmil. Construction started in early 2019.

Fifty percent of the output of the Sunraysia Solar Farm energy will supply AGL Energy, and twenty-five percent will be supplied to the University of New South Wales. The rest will be sold into the National Electricity Market. It is part of AGL's plan to replace the output of its coal-fired Liddell Power Station which is due to close in 2022.

Immediately north of the Sunraysia Solar Farm, the Limondale Solar Farm has been commissioned. Both solar farms will connect to the same 220kV TransGrid substation.

References

Solar power stations in New South Wales
Riverina